The 2014 Toronto Mayoral Election took place on October 27, 2014. Incumbent Mayor Rob Ford initially ran for re-election, but dropped out after being diagnosed with a tumour - instead running for city council in Ward 2. Registration of candidates began on January 2, 2014, and ended September 12, 2014, at 2 pm.

The election was won by former Progressive Conservative Party of Ontario leader and 2003 mayoral runner-up John Tory, who defeated Ford's brother, city councillor Doug Ford, and former Trinity—Spadina MP Olivia Chow.  More than 980,000 Torontonians cast ballots in this election – a record turnout of around 55 percent.

Results
Official results from the City of Toronto as of October 28, 2014.

Candidates
At the close of nominations on September 12, 2014, 67 candidates were registered as per the City of Toronto website. Eighteen candidates had withdrawn including incumbent mayor Rob Ford. Two of the candidates who withdrew ended up re-registering and subsequently withdrawing again.

Registered candidates

Withdrawn
 Glenn Boque – withdrew on September 12
 James Dalzell – withdrew on August 7
 Ryan Doherty – withdrew on August 27
 Ryan Emond – withdrew on August 22
 Rob Ford – the incumbent mayor withdrew on September 12 after being hospitalized with an abdominal tumour and registered to run for city councillor in Ward 2. He endorsed his brother Doug Ford for mayor.
 James French – withdrew on September 11
 Norm Gardner – former city councillor and Toronto Police Services chair, withdrew on September 4
 Happy Happy – withdrew on April 16; re-registered on June 12 and then withdrew again on September 12
 Greg Isaacs – withdrew on February 13
 Robin Lawrance – withdrew on June 30
 Jim McMillan – withdrew on June 30
 Waldemar (Wally) Schwauss – withdrew on May 22; re-registered on July 4; withdrew again on August 19, and re-registered again on September 8.
 Brent Smyth – withdrew on September 9
 David Soknacki – withdrew September 10, saying that his support wasn't growing fast enough and it wouldn't be fair to continue asking volunteers to run an unsuccessful campaign
 Karen Stintz – Ward 16 city councillor and former TTC chair withdrew on August 21 without endorsing another candidate.
Sarah Thomson – withdrew on September 9 and registered to run for city councillor in Ward 20.
Richard Underhill – withdrew on September 12 and endorsed Olivia Chow

Declined to run
Margaret Atwood, a Canadian author. Member of the Green Party. Got into an altercation with Rob Ford in 2011–2012 over closings of several libraries. Stated she's "not running for mayor yet" and later said she would not run.
 Nikki Benz, adult film performer raised in Etobicoke. Announced that she intended to register on National Masturbation Day, May 28, however her expired Ontario driver's licence was not accepted as proof of address and her registration could not be processed.
 Shelley Carroll – Councillor for Ward 33 Don Valley East (2003–present), former Chair of the Budget Committee (2006–2010) and former Toronto District School Board trustee (2000–2003). Carroll registered her candidacy for re-election as Councillor for Ward 33 on February 21, 2014.
Angela Kennedy, Toronto Catholic School Board Trustee for Ward 11 (2000–present), and former chair of the Board (2009–2010). Stated that she will not run for mayor, as she instead will be seeking the provincial seat of Don Valley East.
Sheldon Levy, President and Vice Chancellor of Ryerson University since 2005, who sparked interest from many when announcing that he was stepping down from that position, after 10 years, in 2015. He consistently denied the rumour that he was running for mayor. Toronto Life magazine calls Levy "The Best Mayor Toronto Never Had".
 Denzil Minnan-Wong – Councillor for Ward 34 Don Valley East; first elected to Toronto City Council in 1997. Chair of the Public Works and Infrastructure Committee, a member of the Executive Committee and a supporter of the Progressive Conservative Party of Ontario. Was rumoured to be considering running for mayor; registered to run for his council position on April 24, 2014.
Bob Rae, former MP for Toronto Centre (2008–2013), interim leader of the Liberal Party of Canada (2011–2013), and Premier of Ontario (1990–1995), ruled out running for mayor of Toronto when he announced his resignation as an MP on June 19, 2013.
George Smitherman, former MPP for Toronto Centre (1999–2010), Deputy Premier of Ontario (2007–2010), and 2010 mayoral candidate. Endorsed Olivia Chow.
 Adam Vaughan – Councillor for Ward 20 Trinity—Spadina (2006–present) and former Citytv/CP24 journalist. Instead, ran and was elected to the House of Commons of Canada in the Trinity—Spadina federal by-election.

Issues
According to Nanos Research opinion poll conducted in July 2014 during the election campaign, the main issues concerning the voters were: public transit, high property taxes, jobs and the local economy and traffic.

Public transit
Chow's transit strategy focused on buses under the slogan of "Better bus service. Now." Some of the details included "more comfort and dignity" to bus commuters and adding 10% capacity during peak periods. Rob Ford's plan revolved around subway expansion, building 32 km of subway at an estimated cost of $9 billion. Doug Ford's policy mirrors mayor's pro-subway agenda. Tory presented his SmartTrack plan for transit – a 53-kilometre, 22-stop network that would run on existing commuter rail tracks.

Property taxes
Chow proposed a 1% hike on the levy charged to properties sold for over $2 million. Rob Ford promised to keep property taxes "well below" the rate of inflation. Tory pledged to keep property-tax increases within the rate of inflation.

Jobs and economy
Chow plans to boost economic opportunities by making Toronto the main trading hub for the Chinese currency in North America and Tory considers the mayor's job to "be the principal sales person and ambassador for the city".

Debates

Opinion polls

Endorsements
Some of the candidates have been endorsed by the following prominent persons and media outlets:

References

External links
 
2014 poll-by-poll results for Mayor
2014 Toronto Mayoral Collection – Web archive created by University of Toronto Libraries

2014
Toronto
2014 in Toronto